Pseudatteria bradleyi is a species of moth of the family Tortricidae. It is found in Bolivia.

The length of the forewings is about 14 mm.  The forewings are deep reddish orange, but cream white in the subcostal area and the external third of the wing. The markings are blue-black. The hindwings are deep reddish orange with violet-black marginal spots.

Etymology
The species is named for J. D. Bradley of the British Museum.

References

Moths described in 1966
Pseudatteria